World Premiere (Japanese: ワールドプレミア, foaled 1 February 2016) is a Japanese Thoroughbred racehorse. As a juvenile in 2018 he showed promise by winning his first race and then running third in the Kyoto Nisai Stakes. In the following year he won on his seasonal debut and finished second on his next appearance before being sidelined by injury. He returned in the autumn to run second in the Kobe Shimbun Hai before winning the Kikuka Sho and finishing third in the Arima Kinen. He missed most of the following season, making only two appearances in late autumn. In 2021 he ran third on his seasonal debut and then won the spring edition of the Tenno Sho.

Background
World Premiere is a dark bay or brown colt bred in Hokkaido by Northern Farm. As a foal in 2016 he was consigned to the JRA Select Sale and was bought for ¥259.2 million by Ryoichi Otsuka. The colt was sent into training with Yasuo Tomomichi.

He was from the ninth crop of foals sired by Deep Impact, who was the Japanese Horse of the Year in 2005 and 2006, winning races including the Tokyo Yushun, Tenno Sho, Arima Kinen and Japan Cup. Deep Impact's other progeny include Gentildonna, Harp Star, Kizuna, A Shin Hikari, Marialite and Saxon Warrior.

World Premiere's dam Mandela showed considerable racing ability, winning the Diana-Trial and finishing third in both the Preis der Diana and the Prix de Pomone, and was exported to Japan after being sold for $1.4 million at Keeneland in 2007. Her other foals have included World Ace, who won the Kisaragi Sho and the Yomiuri Milers Cup. As a daughter of the broodmare Mandellicht she was a half-sister to Manduro.

Racing career

2018: two-year-old season
World Premiere made his debut on 21 October in a contest for previously unraced juveniles over 1800 metres at Kyoto Racecourse and won from Meisho Tengen (a colt who went on to win the Yayoi Sho). On 24 November the colt was stepped up in class for the Grade 3 Kyoto Nisai Stakes over 2000 metres at the same track and started at odds of 2.4/1 in an eight-runner field. He was restrained towards the rear of the field before making progress in the straight and came home third behind Courageux Guerrier and Breaking Dawn, beaten four lengths by the winner.

In the official ratings for Japanese two-year-olds World Premiere was awarded a mark of 102, fourteen pounds behind the top-rated Admire Mars.

2019: three-year-old season
World Premiere made a successful start to his second season when he defeated Unicorn Lion and six others in the Tsubaki Sho over 1800 metres at Kyoto on 16 February. At Hanshin Racecourse a month later he ran second to Velox in the Listed Wakaba Stakes over 2000 metres. The performance qualified him to run in the Satsuki Sho but a "bucked shin" kept him off the track until the autumn.

After a break of more than six months World Premiere returned in the Grade 2 Kobe Shimbun Hai (a major trial race for the Kikuka Sho) over 2400 metres at Hanshin on 22 September. Ridden as in all his previous starts by Yutaka Take he started at odds of 12.2/1 and finished third behind Saturnalia and Velox. After the race Yasuo Tomomichi commented "He sweated up a bit in the paddock last time and wasn't so relaxed, but in the race itself he ran well, finishing strongly, so I was pleased with that".

On 20 October World Premiere, with Take in the saddle, was one of eighteen three-year-olds to contest the 80th running of the Kikuka Sho over 3000 metres at Kyoto Racecourse. He was made the 5.5/1 third choice in the betting behind Velox and Nishino Daisy (Tokyo Sports Hai Nisai Stakes) while the other contenders included Red Genial (Kyoto Shimbun Hai), Unicorn Lion and Meisho Tengen. World Premiere started quickly but was then restrained by Take and settled behind the leaders on the rails as the outsider Caudillo set a steady pace. Take made a forward move entering the straight and World Premiere gained the advantage 200 metres out before holding off the late challenge of Satono Lux by a neck with Velox a length away in third place. Take commented "He was a bit keen at first but was in hand nicely during the race. He wasn’t able to run in the first two of the Triple Crown races so I am glad that he was able to claim the last one. He’s still got a lot to improve so I’m looking forward to his future races." Tomomichi added "He's recovered over the summer from his spring campaign of races, and it's good he's had the one recent run to sharpen him up. While he can misbehave a little, he seems to have improved on this front, and in some ways, I think this is actually good for him".

For his final run of the year World Premiere was matched against older horses in the Arima Kinen over 2500 metres at Nakayama Racecourse on 22 December. He raced towards the rear of the field before staying on strongly in the straight to take third place behind Lys Gracieux and Saturnalia.

In January 2020, at the JRA Awards for 2019, World Premiere finished fifth in the poll to determine the Best Three-Year-Old Colt.

2020: four-year-old season
World Premiere's main targets in the early part of 2020 were the spring edition of the Tenno Sho and the Takarazuka Kinen but after the colt showing unsatisfactory performances in training (he was reportedly "favoring his right foreleg") Yasuo Tomomichi opted to reserve him for an autumn campaign.

After an absence of more than eleven months, World Premiere returned to the track for the Japan Cup over 2400 metres at Tokyo Racecourse on 29 November. Starting a 44.4/1 outsider he raced on the inside before making steady progress in the straight to come home sixth of the fifteen runners, five lengths behind the winner Almond Eye. After the race Tomoichi commented "He was worked up on race day, no doubt due to the time between races. Considering the lineup and that he was back from a layoff, I think he did exceptionally well." The colt ended his season with a second attempt to win the Arima Kinen on 27 December when she started the 12.5/1 fifth choice in the betting and dead-heated for fifth place with Curren Bouquetd'or three and a half lengths behind the winner Chrono Genesis.

In the 2020 World's Best Racehorse Rankings, World Premiere was rated on 118, making him the equal 80th best racehorse in the world.

Pedigree

References

2016 racehorse births
Racehorses bred in Japan
Racehorses trained in Japan
Thoroughbred family 3-d